Harold Herman Raether (October 10, 1932 – September 26, 2020), nicknamed "Bud", was an American Major League Baseball relief pitcher. He appeared in only two games in MLB, one for the  Philadelphia Athletics, and one for the  Kansas City Athletics three years later, after the franchise moved to Kansas City, Missouri.

Raether played at the collegiate level at the University of Wisconsin-Madison. His pro career began in 1954 and lasted for four seasons (1954–55 and 1957–58). In the majors, he allowed three earned runs and three hits in four full innings pitched; he issued four bases on balls and did not record a strikeout. One of the hits he surrendered was a home run, hit by eventual Baseball Hall of Famer George Kell on May 19, 1957.

Raether died on September 26, 2020 at the age of 87.

References

1932 births
2020 deaths
Albany Senators players
Baseball players from Wisconsin
Columbia Gems players
Kansas City Athletics players
Lancaster Red Roses players
Major League Baseball pitchers
People from Lake Mills, Wisconsin
Philadelphia Athletics players
Rochester/Winona A's players
Savannah A's players
Wisconsin Badgers baseball players